is a railway station on the Aoimori Railway Line in the town of Oirase in Aomori Prefecture, Japan, operated by the third sector railway operator Aoimori Railway Company.

Lines
Mukaiyama Station is served by the Aoimori Railway Line, and is 79.7 kilometers from the terminus of the line at Aomori Station. It is 659.5 kilometers from Tokyo Station.

Station layout
Mukaiyama Station has a single ground-level island platform serving two tracks connected to the station building by a footbridge. The station is unattended.

Platforms

History
The station opened on July 10, 1936. With the privatization of JNR on April 1, 1987, it came under the operational control of East Japan Railway Company (JR East).

Surrounding area
Kawano Green Farm

See also
 List of Railway Stations in Japan

References

External links
Aoimori Railway station information 

Railway stations in Aomori Prefecture
Railway stations in Japan opened in 1936
Oirase, Aomori
Aoimori Railway Line